Brigitte Fouré (born 13 August 1955 in Amiens) is a French university lecturer and former government minister, a member of the Nouveau Centre and of Société en mouvement  ("Society on the Move")  She is also a lecturer in law at the University of Picardie Jules Verne.

Early life and education
Daughter of a farmer, Fouré studied law at Amiens and Paris.

Political career
An activist for the UNI and then the CNI, Fouré was elected regional councillor in 1986 and conseillère municipale ("Municipal Councillor") in 1989.  With Gilles de Robien she had responsibility for education and youth work. She joined the Parti républicain ("Republican Party") in 1992, within the Union for French Democracy. She became Mayor of Amiens in 1992 and was appointed a minister in Jean-Pierre Raffarin's first government.

In the French Regional Elections of 2004, Fouré was elected on the right-wing ticket of Gilles de Robien.  She resigned on 23 March 2007 to become second deputy mayor with responsibility for Local Democracy, Community Life, Prevention and Security.

On 1 January 2008 Fouré succeeded Jean-Louis Bourlanges as a Member of the European Parliament. In parliament, she briefly served on the Committee on Transport and Tourism. Her mandate expired in June 2009.

Current mandates
Regional Councillor of Picardy
Municipal Councillor of Amiens

Political positions
In 2019, Fouré publicly declared her support for incumbent President Emmanuel Macron.

Honours
Chevalier de la Légion d'honneur

Sources
This article was translated from its equivalent in the French Wikipedia on 19 July 2009.

References

External links
 BrigitteFouce.hautetfort.com, Official blog 

1955 births
Living people
Women mayors of places in France
Chevaliers of the Légion d'honneur
People from Amiens
Politicians from Hauts-de-France
Paris 2 Panthéon-Assas University alumni
Union of Democrats and Independents politicians
21st-century French women politicians